Dirty Sanchez may refer to: big daddy

Television and film
 Dirty Sanchez (TV series), a 2003 British television series also known as Team Sanchez
 Dirty Sanchez: The Movie, a 2006 comedy film based on the TV series
 Dirty Sanchez, a character in the film Big Money Rustlas

Music
 Dirty Sanchez (band), an electroclash band from Los Angeles, California
 "Dirty Sanchez", a song by the band Burden Brothers on the album 8 Ball
 "Dirty Sanchez", a song by the band Ghoultown on the album Give 'Em More Rope
 Dirty Sanchez, an album by the band Zeke

Other
 Dirty Sanchez (sexual act), an act associated with coprophilia